Muncie Girls is a British punk rock band formed in Exeter in 2010. It is made up of Lande Hekt (bass, rhythm guitar, vocals), Dean McMullen (lead guitar), and Luke Ellis (drums). They have several releases, including two full-length albums From Caplan to Belsize (2016) and Fixed Ideals (2018), on hometown label Specialist Subject Records and have toured internationally.

History
Lande Hekt and Dean McMullen formed Muncie Girls in 2010 while attending Exeter College. They played their first gigs at the Cavern Club, their local rock venue, and became very involved in the underground DIY Punk scene. The band put on their own shows, as well as fundraising events, and Hekt started a music workshop for women under the name 'School of Frock'. Ellis joined in 2012, solidifying the lineup.

After releasing two EPs on hometown label Specialist Subject Records in 2012 and 2013, the label released their debut album From Caplan To Belsize on 4 March 2016, recorded at The Ranch in Southampton. The title of the album is a reference to ‘The Bell Jar’ by Sylvia Plath. It references the two asylums the book's protagonist is kept in, and is used to represent the idea of the album being a journey.

The album was received well including 5/5 reviews in Kerrang!, Upset and 9/10 in Rock Sound. The band was also nominated for 'Best British Newcomer' at the Kerrang! Awards 2016.

Following the album, the band toured internationally including support slots with Taking Back Sunday, Frank Iero (of My Chemical Romance), Los Campesinos!, The Wonder Years, and Such Gold. They played Glastonbury Festival and appeared with Billy Bragg on the Left Field Stage as well as Reading and Leeds Festivals, Groezrock and SXSW.

On 13 June 2018 the band announced their second LP Fixed Ideals (another Plath reference, this time a line from the poem "To Eva") with a video for lead single "Picture of Health". Hekt described the new collection as some of the most personal songs she'd written, with a diverse range of influences, such as The Replacements, Siouxsie and the Banshees, The Popguns and The Pastels. The album was released on 31 August 2018.

On 15 November 2019 Hekt self-released her first solo record, Gigantic Disappointment, to positive reviews. A full-length follow up, Going to Hell, was released 22 January 2021 on Get Better Records

On 14 January 2022 McMullen released his first solo single, Clouds Hold Up The Sun on Fierce Panda Records.

Discography

Albums
From Caplan To Belsize - Specialist Subject Records (UK) / Uncle M Music (EU) / Animal Style Records (US) 12" LP, CD, MP3 (2016)
Fixed Ideals - Specialist Subject Records (UK) / Buzz Records (Canada) / Lost Boy (AUS) 12" LP, CD, MP3 (2018)

EPS
Revolution Summer - Specialist Subject Records, 12" EP, CD, MP3 (2012)
Sleepless - Specialist Subject Records, 12" EP, CD, MP3 (2013)
B-Sides the Point- Specialist Subject Records, 12" EP, MP3 (2020)

Split Releases
Split with Great Cynics - Specialist Subject Records, 12" EP, MP3 (2014)
Split with Sandlotkids - Uncle M Music, 7", MP3 (2013)
Split with The Hard Aches - Anchorhead Records, 7" (2017) - "Respect" from From Caplan to Belsize released as B-side single.

Singles
Picture of Health - Specialist Subject Records, 7", MP3 (2018)

References

External links 
 Official Website
 Muncie Girls Spotify
 Specialist Subject Records

Underground punk scene in the United Kingdom
Musical groups established in 2010
English indie rock groups
English punk rock groups
Specialist Subject Records artists
2010 establishments in England